Lord Camber's Ladies (1932) is a British drama film directed by Benn W. Levy, produced by Alfred Hitchcock, and starring Gerald du Maurier, Gertrude Lawrence, Benita Hume, and Nigel Bruce.

Plot
An aristocrat marries a singer, but then tries to murder her when he falls in love with another woman.

Cast
 Gerald du Maurier as Doctor Napier
 Gertrude Lawrence as Lady Camber
 Benita Hume as Janet King
 Nigel Bruce as Lord Camber
 Clare Greet as Peach
 A. Bromley Davenport as Sir Bedford Slufter
 Betty Norton as Hetty
 Harold Meade as Ainley
 Hugh E. Wright as Old Man
 Hal Gordon as Stage Manager
 Molly Lamont as Actress

Production background
This is the only film Alfred Hitchcock produced but did not direct. It was later dismissed by him as a BIP quota quickie: "a poison thing. I gave it to Benn Levy to direct". It is an adaptation of the 1915 play The Case of Lady Camber by Horace Annesley Vachell. The play had previously been filmed in 1915 by Walter West.

References

External links

1932 films
1932 drama films
Films shot at British International Pictures Studios
Films directed by Benn Levy
Films produced by Alfred Hitchcock
British drama films
British black-and-white films
Films set in London
British films based on plays
1930s English-language films
1930s British films